8444 may refer to:
The year in the 9th millennium
8444 Popovich, a Mars-crossing Asteroid
Union Pacific 844, a Union Pacific steam locomotive which was numbered 8444 between 1962 and 1989